The Nevada Baptist Convention (NBC) is a group of churches affiliated with the Southern Baptist Convention located in the U.S. state of Nevada. Headquartered in Reno, Nevada, the convention is made up of 4 Baptist associations and around 175 churches as of 2010.

Affiliated Organizations 
Nevada Baptist Foundation
The Nevada Baptist - the state newspaper

External links
Nevada Baptist Convention

References

Christianity in Nevada
Conventions associated with the Southern Baptist Convention